The Humanist Party of Solidarity was a Brazilian political party. Its electoral code was 31 and it became a registered political party on 6 July 1995 with the denomination of "National Solidarity Party" (PSN) and obtained permanent record on 20 March 1997, with its first president being Phillipe Guedon of France. The party advocated distributism and Christian morals.

In the presidential elections of 1998, still with the previous denomination, launched the candidate Vasco Neto. He would receive 109,003 votes, totaling 0.16% of intentions, finishing in 12th place. In 2000 it changed its name to the current one, merging with the group that tried to organize the National Humanist Party. In 2006, the party had officialized its merger with the  Popular Socialist Party (PPS) and Party of National Mobilization (PMN) in order to form the Democratic Mobilization, a new association created in order to circumvent the restrictions of the barrier clause, but with its overthrow, the association was broken up and the parties separated.

In 2018, after not getting enough electoral votes to keep receiving funds from the Brazilian Supreme Electoral Court, the party decided to disband itself and merge with Podemos.

Electoral results

Presidential elections

References

1995 establishments in Brazil
Political parties established in 1997
Political parties disestablished in 2018
2018 disestablishments in Brazil
Political parties in Brazil
Defunct political parties in Brazil
Christian democratic parties in South America